Atractosporocybe is a mushroom genus in the family Tricholomataceae in the broad sense. The type species resembles Clitocybe and grows in forests.

Etymology
The name Atractosporocybe is derived from ancient Greek 'atractos' referring to the fusiform shape of the spores ('-sporo') and '-cybe', a reference to head or cap.

See also
List of Agaricales genera

References

Agaricales genera
Tricholomataceae
Taxa described in 2015